Gitte Sunesen (born 11 December 1971) is a former Danish team handball player, Olympic champion and World champion. She received a gold medal with the Danish national team at the 1996 Summer Olympics in Atlanta. She is World champion from 1997.

References

1971 births
Living people
Danish female handball players
Olympic gold medalists for Denmark
Handball players at the 1996 Summer Olympics
Olympic medalists in handball
Medalists at the 1996 Summer Olympics
People from Favrskov Municipality
Sportspeople from the Central Denmark Region